Aspergillus dybowskii is a species of fungus in the genus Aspergillus which occurs in Southeast Asia.

References

Further reading
 

 

dybowskii
Fungi described in 1985